Nobody Wants to Be Alone is the twelfth studio album by American country music singer Crystal Gayle. Released in April 1985, it peaked at #17 on the Billboard Country albums chart.

In a front page New York Times article titled, "Country Music in Decline," this album was noted as one of many that were indicative of a trend, marking "the end of an era" for the genre: despite two top 5 hits, "Crystal Gayle's latest album sold fewer than 80,000 copies" six months after its release.

Two singles from the album also made the Country singles charts; the title track reached #3 in early 1985, and "A Long and Lasting Love" reached #5 later that year. Though the song wasn't released as a single to Country radio, a video was produced for "Touch and Go."

Track listing

Personnel
Crystal Gayle - lead vocals
Dann Huff, Dean Parks, Billy Joe Walker Jr., Chris Leuzinger, Reggie Young, Billy Sanford - guitar
Neil Stubenhaus, David Hungate - bass
Joe Allen - acoustic bass on "God Bless the Child"
Randy Kerber - piano, electric piano, DX7 synthesizer
John Jarvis, Alan Steinberger - keyboards
Robbie Buchanan - electric piano, DX7 synthesizer
John Hobbs, Charles Cochran - piano
John Robinson, Matt Betton, Kenny Malone - drums
Tom Roady - percussion
Jay Patten - saxophone
Jim Horn - recorder, flute
Warren Luening - trumpet on "God Bless the Child"
Andrea Robinson, Beth Andersen, Cindy Richardson, Ralph Murphy, Roger Cook, Angie Jareé, Darlene Koldenhoven, Allen Reynolds, Laura Creamer, Sue Sheridan - harmony vocals
The Sid Sharp Strings - strings
Larry Muhoberac - string conductor
Gene Page, Larry Muhoberac, Lee Holdridge - string arrangements

Charts

Weekly charts

Year-end charts

References

Crystal Gayle albums
1985 albums
Albums produced by Jimmy Bowen
Albums produced by Michael Masser
albums arranged by Gene Page
albums arranged by Lee Holdridge
albums arranged by Larry Muhoberac
Warner Records albums